Hannah Marshall (born 1973 in London) is a British experimental and free improvising musician (cello, vocals) and composer.

Biography 
Hannah Marshall has played on the British and European improvisation scene since the 2000s, with amongst others Polar Bear, Terry Day, Alex Ward, Alexander Hawkins, Veryan Weston, Satoko Fukuda, Alison Blunt, Tony Marsh, Neil Metcalfe, Ingrid Laubrock, Rachel Musson and Dominic Lash;, Evan Parker, Luc Ex and Fred Frith. She also joined the Insub Meta Orchestra, the London Improvisers Orchestra and the Oxford Improvisers Orchestra. In 2012 she made a solo album Tulse Hill (Linear Obsessional Recordings). She is listed in 19 recording in the field of jazz between 2005 and 2014 by the discographer Tom Lord.

Discography 
 Trio of Uncertainty: Unlocked (Emanem, 2007), with Veryan Weston, Satoko Fukuda  
 Barrel: Gratuitous Abuse (Emanem, 2011), with Alison Blunt, Ivor Kallin 
 Veryan Weston / Ingrid Laubrock / Hannah Marshall : Haste (Emanem, 2012)
 Veryan Weston / Jon Rose / Hannah Marshall: Tuning Out (Emanem, 2015) 
 Paul Dunmall, Phillip Gibbs, Alison Blunt, Neil Metcalfe, Hanna Marshall: I Look at You (FMR, 2015)

References

External links 
 Official website
 
 
 Interview in Julie Kjærs Reihe Female Musicians on the London Improv Scene

1973 births
Living people
British jazz musicians
Jazz cellists